Dangme District is a former district council that was located in Greater Accra Region, Ghana. Originally created as an ordinary district assembly in 1975. However on 1988, it was split off into two new district assemblies: Dangme East District (capital: Ada Foah) and Dangme West District (capital: Dodowa). The district assembly was located in the eastern part of Greater Accra Region and had Ada Foah as its capital town.

References

1989 disestablishments in Africa

Greater Accra Region

Former districts of Ghana

States and territories disestablished in 1989